The main duties of law enforcement in Hong Kong are taken up by the Hong Kong Police Force. Other major law enforcement agencies (LEAs) include the Customs and Excise Department, the Independent Commission Against Corruption (ICAC), Hong Kong Correctional Services department, the Immigration Department. The Commissioner of the ICAC reports directly to the Chief Executive, and the heads of the other three agencies report to Secretary for Security.

Minor duties such as hawkers' regulation and anti-smoking are nevertheless assumed by officers of other government departments, including the Food and Environmental Hygiene Department, the Leisure and Cultural Services Department and the Housing Department. Compliance with fire safety requirements is overseen by the Fire Services Department.